
Juri Quta (Aymara juri mud, muddy water, quta lake, "mud lake" or "dull lake ", hispanicized spellings Juri Kkota, Juri Khota, Juri Kota, Yuri Kkota) is a lake in the Cordillera Real of Bolivia located in the La Paz Department, Los Andes Province, Batallas Municipality, Turquia Canton. It lies north of the Kunturiri massif, south-east of Wila Lluxita and east of Wila Lluxi, at the feet of Mullu Apachita and Jisk'a Turini. Juri Quta is situated at a height of about 4,596 metres (15,079 ft), about 0,5 km (0.31 miles) long and 0,25 km (0.16 miles) at its widest point. The little lake north of Juri Quta is named Ch'uxña Quta ("green lake", Chojña Kkota).

See also 
 Jisk'a Pata
 Phaq'u Kiwuta
 Q'ara Quta
 Warawarani

External links 
 Batallas Municipality: population data and map. Juri Quta (not shown) is situated north-east of Nigruni, in the Turquia Canton.

References 

Lakes of La Paz Department (Bolivia)

qu:Juri Quta (Antikuna)